Darhamzeh may refer to:
 Darhamzeh, Anbarabad